Dániel Nagy (born 22 November 1984) is a Hungarian football player who most recently played for BFC Siófok. He is notable for a goal against Újpesti TE, when he made a 70-meter run on the right wing, and scored.

External links
 Profile 
 Profile at Futball-adattár 
 

1984 births
Living people
Sportspeople from Székesfehérvár
Hungarian footballers
Association football midfielders
Fehérvár FC players
Szombathelyi Haladás footballers
Puskás Akadémia FC players
BFC Siófok players
Nemzeti Bajnokság I players